The Grimoire of Pope Honorius, or Le Grimoire du Pape Honorius, is a 17th to 18th century grimoire, which claims to have been written by Pope Honorius III (1150 - 1227). It is unique among grimoires in that it was specifically designed to be used by a priest, and some of the instructions include saying a Mass. While its name is derived from the 13th century Grimoire of Honorius, its content is closer to later grimories like the Key of Solomon and Grimorium Verum.

The first edition of the Grimoire is said to have appeared in 1629, and was likely forged near the end of the sixteenth century, roughly four hundred years after the death of its supposed author. According to A. E. Waite, "...[I]t is a malicious and somewhat clever imposture, which was undeniably calculated to deceive ignorant persons of its period who may have been magically inclined, more especially ignorant priests, since it pretends to convey the express sanction of the Apostolical Seat for the operations of Infernal Magic and Necromancy."

References

External links 
 Online edition by Joseph H. Peterson (1999).

Goetia
Honorius, Pope